Nathaniel "Nate" Behar (born September 29, 1994) is a professional Canadian football wide receiver for the Ottawa Redblacks of the Canadian Football League (CFL). He played for two years with the Edmonton Eskimos prior to becoming a free agent and signing with the Redblacks. He played U Sports football for the Carleton Ravens from 2013 to 2016.

University career

Carleton Ravens 
On November 16, 2012, it was announced that Behar had signed a letter of intent to play for the Carleton Ravens' re-established program which began in 2013. He had been ranked as the number one high school wide receiver prospect in the country. He enjoyed a productive four-year career with the Ravens; totaling 178 receptions for 2,577 yards, and 21 touchdowns. His most famous touchdown, arguably, was on a last-play Hail Mary pass to win the 2014 Panda Game. At the end of his four-years, he was ranked as the ninth best player available in the 2017 CFL Draft.

Professional career

Edmonton Eskimos 
Behar was drafted fifth overall by the Edmonton Eskimos in the 2017 CFL Draft, but held off signing with the team as he and his agent entered a contract dispute with the club. He missed the team's rookie camp and training camp and was reportedly dissatisfied with the negotiation process as his contract offer became worse the longer he held out. Behar signed with the Eskimos on June 21, 2017, three days before the team's season opening game, to a two-year contract. He played in 12 regular season games that year, primarily on special teams as he recorded four special teams tackles. In 2018, he played in all 18 regular season games and started eight, recording 27 catches for 257 receiving yards. He scored his first touchdown on August 9, 2018 against the BC Lions. He played in 30 regular season games with the Eskimos and became a free agent upon the expiry of his contract on February 12, 2019.

Ottawa Redblacks 
On February 15, 2019, Behar signed with the Ottawa Redblacks to, reportedly, a one-year contract. In his first season in Ottawa, he caught 16 passes for 169 yards. He became a free agent upon the expiry of his contract on February 11, 2020, and did not sign with any team in 2020, where the league cancelled the 2020 CFL season. After not playing football in 2020, Behar re-signed with the Redblacks on June 28, 2021. During the 2021 season, he played in all 14 regular season games, catching 34 passes for 439 yards, both career highs. He was also the team's emergency quarterback and was pressed into duty on September 22, 2021, when both Dominique Davis and Matt Nichols succumbed to injuries. In that game, he played in two series where he had two carries for three yards and one completed pass for three yards. On January 20, 2022, Behar signed a one-year extension to remain with the Redblacks. Behar continued his strong play into the 2022 season posting new career highs in receptions (59), receiving yards (727), and touchdowns (2), despite missing five games due to injury. On December 16, 2022, Behar and the Redblacks agreed to a two-year contract extension.

References

External links
Ottawa Redblacks bio
Carleton Ravens profile

1994 births
Living people
Canadian football wide receivers
Sportspeople from London, Ontario
Players of Canadian football from Ontario
Carleton Ravens football players
Edmonton Elks players
Ottawa Redblacks players